Teen Gen is a Philippine television drama series broadcast by GMA Network. The series is a spin-off of the 1990s television series T.G.I.S. Directed by Mark Reyes and Albert Langitan, it stars Angelu de Leon and Bobby Andrews. It premiered on December 16, 2012, on the network's Sunday afternoon line up. The series concluded on June 30, 2013, with a total of 28 episodes.

Cast and characters

Main cast
 Angelu de Leon as Ma. Patrice "Peachy" Real-Torres nee da Silva – A main character from TGIS and Growing Up, Peachy was originally slated to marry Wacks during the initial season of Growing Up, but eventually bailed. By the time of the events of Teen Gen, Peachy is a widowed single mother.
 Bobby Andrews as Joaquin "Wacks" Torres III - The second of two main characters returning from TGIS and Growing Up, Wacks is Lucho's father and a motorcycle businessman. In the interlude between Growing Up and Teen Gen, Wacks is revealed to have gotten married and had a son, but the marriage fell apart because of irreconcilable differences. As a result, Wacks is committed to being a single father and aims to raise him as a responsible man. His world turns upside down just after moving into the subdivision only to discover that his old flame Peachy, was living next door, prompting him to confront her over their failed wedding.
 Dianne Hernandez as Ma. Lyca da Silva – Peachy's only child, Lyca is a smart student at West Ridge High, running the school paper and often carries a camera. Her status makes everybody on campus think of her as a geeky outcast. She becomes the catalyst for Lucho's change of heart.
 Juancho Trivino as Luis Joaquin "Lucho" Torres IV – Lucho is Wacks' only son and Team Gwapo's leader. Often seen as the bad boy, it is revealed that his rebellious behavior is because of resentment over his father's lack of time for him. His and TG's picking on Lyca gradually changes him into a more responsible person and likes her back. When his mother, Violet, warns that Peachy and Wacks' marriage will shoot down his chances of a relationship with Lyka, he dismisses it and resolves to take care of them.
 Jeric Gonzales as Santiago "Tiago" Torres – Wacks' nephew and Lucho's cousin, Tiago is TG's resident musician. He is depicted as the son of a shipping magnate, but does not let his rich-kid status go to his head. Wacks often calls on him to rein in Lucho's bad behavior.
 Thea Tolentino as Angela "Angge" Parahinog - Lyca's best friend in school, Angge comes from a poor family and being a breadwinner, often has to sell various food items on campus to raise money for her family and a future trip to South Korea. The latter is depicted as the ultimate achievement of her fascination with Hallyu culture. This causes her to frequently allude certain events to scenes in Korean drama series such as Endless Love and Boys Over Flowers. Although Angge is struggling to make ends meet, a dead aunt's family inheritance helps her family rise out of poverty.
 Gianna Revilla as Madison Avenida – One of the more popular girls in school, Madison is every bit a trendsetter and claims to have followers on Twitter and Instagram. She is one of the campus A-listers, but gradually hangs out with the other female characters.
 Abel Estanislao as Jose Vicente "JV" Cortez - One of the four TG boys, JV is a young man from the province. He often has a penchant for romantic gestures.
 Sunyee Maluche as Andrea "Drew" Remulla – The captain of the West Ridge High women's basketball team, Drew is JV's childhood friend. Often teased by Itos because of her seemingly tough exterior, Drew is actually very sensitive and romantic. Over the course of the series, Drew pines for affection from JV, who only sees her as one of the guys.
 Seth Isay as Carlitos "Itos" Buenavidez Jr. – Lucho's best friend and one of the four TG boys, Itos is the athletic type and tries to have his way with women. Isay left the show in late 2012, citing personal reasons. His character was written off as having signed up for a soccer league in the US.
 Mikoy Morales as Xavier "Xavi" de Leon - Itos' "replacement" in the TG quartet, Xavi is depicted as a suave, debonair young man. He was dumped from the clique years before because of differences with the other members (especially Lucho), but they patch things up. Over the course of the show, he gradually works with Madison to try getting JV and Drew together.

Guest cast
 Gab de Leon as Jeffrey "Jeff" Buenavidez
 Isabel Granada as Mrs.Parahinog
 Robert Ortega as Mr. Parahinog
 Rica Peralejo as Czarina
 Arkin Magalona as Mackenzie Parahinog
 Michael Flores as Miguel "Migs" Ledesma
 Bernadette Allyson as Beatrice "Bea" Santillan
 Ara Mina as Violet Bernardo
 Bubbles Paraiso as Sophie Torres
 Alden Richards as Inigo Bermudez
 Neri Naig as Selena Ramirez

Background

GMA Network and Viva Television greenlit the creation of a youth-oriented show for a Saturday afternoon time slot, which had a non-existent audience market, in 1995. Screenwriter Kit Villanueva-Langit and producers Veronique del Rosario-Corpus and Cely Santiago hit on the idea for TGIS, with Mark Reyes as director. The show lasted for over 100 episodes, and led to a feature film and a Primetime show, Growing Up featuring most of the original cast members depicted as moving on to college.

Production and development
Because of the growing clamor to revive TGIS, the network came up with the idea to create a spin-off, with two leading characters from the original series brought back to be part of a new cast. TGIS original headwriter, Kit Villanueva-Langit, began developing the spin-off series mid-2012, under the title "TGIS New Generation". The title eventually changed to Teen Gen as show creator/director Mark Reyes and the whole production team wanted the show to have a fresh start and "[...] we don't want to look back, but to move forward."

Auditions for the new cast took place at GMA Network Center in Quezon City in September 2012. Mark Reyes, Kit Villanueva-Langit and series' executive producer Jan Navarro served as the casting panel. The casting was finalized in October 2012. TGIS alumni and loveteam Angelu de Leon and Bobby Andrews were the first two actors to be cast reprising their original characters Peachy and Wacks, respectively. Protégé: The Battle For The Big Artista Break winners, Jeric Gonzales and Thea Tolentino, commercial models Dianne Hernandez and Juancho Trivino were chosen for the roles of Lyca and Lucho, respectively. Gianna Revilla, Gab de Leon and Arkin Magalona - all children of prominent local showbiz celebrities - auditioned and landed roles.

More changes occurred to the series' story lines during the casting process. The production team found that they had to adjust the characters they had written to suit the actors. Following the rumors of other TGIS alumni appearing on the show, Reyes confirmed that Michael Flores, Bernadette Allyson, Ciara Sotto and Rica Peralejo would be returning in recurring roles for a few episodes as their original characters. However, only the first two indeed appeared before the camera - circumstances prevented Sotto and Peralejo's cameo.

The production began on November 25, 2012. Most of the series' scenes were shot on location in a private subdivision in Quezon City.

In an interview on April 4, 2013, Mark Reyes announced that he was leaving the show for a while to concentrate on his directorial job for the primetime series Love & Lies. Albert Langitan formally took over directorial duties at the start of the second season. The same season, Seth Isay confirmed his departure from the show, citing personal reasons for his decision. Another Protégé season 2 alumnus Mikoy Morales joined the cast in the early part of season two and was promoted to series regular for the show's third season.

In May 2013, the network renewed the show for a shorter third season, comprising only two episodes. However, GMA management shortly announced that Teen Gen would be cancelled. Officials explained that the show, along with Party Pilipinas on May 18, 2013, were axed to make way for a new show.

Ratings
According to AGB Nielsen Philippines' Mega Manila household television ratings, the pilot episode of Teen Gen earned a 9.1% rating. While the final episode scored an 8.6% rating.

Accolades

References

External links
 

2012 Philippine television series debuts
2013 Philippine television series endings
Filipino-language television shows
GMA Network drama series
Philippine teen drama television series
Television series about teenagers
Television shows set in Quezon City